Maryland Route 130 (MD 130) is a state highway located in Baltimore County in the U.S. state of Maryland. Known as Greenspring Valley Road, the state highway runs  from MD 140 in Garrison east to MD 25 in Brooklandville. MD 130 passes through the Green Spring Valley, an affluent area around the upper reaches of Jones Falls that contains Stevenson University. The state highway was paved by 1910 except for a gap near Stevenson that was closed in the mid-1930s.

Route description

MD 130 begins at an intersection with MD 140 (Reisterstown Road) in Garrison. The state highway heads east as a two-lane undivided road and passes along the edge of the Green Spring Valley Hunt Club and the Green Spring Valley Golf Course, at the edge of which the highway passes through a right-angle curve. MD 130 enters a more rural area and intersects MD 129 (Park Heights Avenue). The state highway passes through the Green Spring Valley Historic District around its intersection with Stevenson Road, which leads south through the hamlet of Stevenson. MD 130 passes through another sharp curve, crosses the North Branch of Jones Falls, passes north of the main campus of Stevenson University, and passes through a pair of right-angle curves just east of the Gramercy Mansion and west of its junction with Greenspring Avenue. The state highway crosses Dipping Pond Run and passes to the south of St. Paul's School before reaching its eastern terminus with MD 25 (Falls Road) in Brooklandville.

History
All of Greenspring Road was paved by 1910 except for a gap at Stevenson Road. That gap in MD 130 was filled in 1934. There has been very little change to MD 130 since then.

Junction list

See also

References

External links

MDRoads: MD 130

130
Roads in Baltimore County, Maryland